The eighth season of CSI: NY originally aired on CBS between September 2011 and May 2012. It consisted of 18 episodes. Its regular time slot continued on Fridays at 9pm/8c.

CSI: NY The Eighth Season was released on DVD in the U.S. on September 25, 2012.

Cast

Main cast
Gary Sinise as Mac Taylor
Sela Ward as Jo Danville
Carmine Giovinazzo as Danny Messer
Anna Belknap as Lindsay Messer
Robert Joy as Sid Hammerback
A. J. Buckley as Adam Ross
Hill Harper as Sheldon Hawkes
Eddie Cahill as Don Flack

Recurring cast
Kathleen Munroe as Samantha Flack
Megan Dodds as Christine Whitney

Episodes

References

External links

CSI: NY Season 8 Episode List on Internet Movie Database
CSI: NY Season 8 Episode Guide on CSI Files
CSI: New York on CBS on The Futon Critic

2011 American television seasons
2012 American television seasons
08